The Australian Aboriginal Progressive Association (AAPA) was an early Indigenous Australian organisation focused on Aboriginal rights, founded in 1924 and based in  Sydney, New South Wales (NSW). It ceased operations in 1927. The AAPA is known as the first Aboriginal activist group to unite in Australia. The organisation's membership roster peaked at over 600 AAPA members, with 13 branches and 4 sub branches in NSW.

The aim of the AAPA was to stop the removal of Aboriginal children from their homes, gain equality between Aboriginal and Caucasian society, preserve Indigenous cultural identity and citizenship, and ensure Indigenous Australians were equipped to reach economic independence through reattaining land ownership. Approximately 500 members joined the association within the first six months of its commencement. The AAPA called for the eradication of the NSW Aborigines Protection board, and that Indigenous people be in charge of Indigenous matters.

History and description
Founded in 1924 by Fred Maynard, and publicly announced the following year, the aim of the association was to defend the rights of Aboriginal people. Maynard had been involved in another organisation, the Coloured Progressive Association, a decade earlier and he and co-leader Tom Lacey were inspired by the ideas of Jamaican activist Marcus Garvey.

The organisation was based in Surry Hills, Sydney, but eventually expanded to 11 branches across New South Wales, and over 500 active members.  It campaigned against the NSW Aborigines Protection Board (APB) to gain Indigenous rights to land, identity and citizenship, alongside the fight to end the removal of Aboriginal children from their homes.

The AAPA was motivated by the mistreatment of Aboriginals throughout Australia's past. The year 1788 marked the first year Europeans placed Indigenous Australians amongst new diseases, violence, dispossession and displacement. Leading to a significant decrease in the Indigenous population and the slow removal of their culture throughout the nation. The Aborigines Protection Act 1909 was introduced in the 20th century which aimed to protect Indigenous Australians through methods such as assimilation. The introduction of this act gave power to organisations such as the NSW APB. In 1915, the act introduced an amendment which allowed for the removal of Indigenous Australians under 21. The removal of children from their family is more commonly known as the Stolen Generations.

The practice of removing Indigenous children from their homes was an attempt by the Australian government to improve their welfare and protect the children from neglect through assimilation. This policy lasted from the 1910s to the 1970s. Around 1 in 3 Indigenous children were removed from their homes and families under this policy. Once the children were removed they would be forced into Caucasian society which banned them from speaking their Indigenous language or partake in any practices from their traditional culture. This included changing their names and overall identities. The children were abused and mistreated. This example of Aboriginal mistreatment and corrupt government policy is one of the reasons the association was created to speak against the government. Alongside this, land allocated to Indigenous Australians was reduced from 26,000 acres to 13,000 acres between the years 1913 and 1927, forcing families to relocate from their homelands.

People

Fred Maynard 
Fred Maynard was born in 1879, and was the founder and leader of the AAPA. Maynard was a Worimi man who aimed to voice his disapproval of Aboriginal mistreatment. Maynard's uncle Tom Phillips was an Aboriginal farmer whose reserve was taken by the NSW Aborigines protection board in 1916, and access to the reserve by Indigenous people was removed entirely. Maynard rose to leadership through use of his skills in public speaking to voice the concerns of Indigenous Australians. Due to his pervasive and passionate stance against the NSW APB, his rights to speak on Aboriginal reserves were revoked.

Maynard had connections with members of the Coloured Progressive Association (CPA), that operated in Sydney from 1903 to 1919, and Marcus Garvey's, Universal Negro Improvement Association. Maynard and Lacey took inspiration from Garvey's leadership role and his message preaching cultural pride. This led to the formation of the AAPA in 1924. "We want to work out our own destiny. Our people have not had the courage to stand together in the past, but now we are united, and are determined to work for the preservation for all of those interests, which are near and dear to us.”  - Fred Maynard

J. Johnstone 
J. Johnstone was the vice-president of the AAPA. Johnstone came from a family who, in 1882, settled the Wingham reserve and had it removed from them in 1921. Johnstone was similarly in a later Aborigines Association under leadership of Bill Ferguson.

James Linwood 
James Linwood was another member of the AAPA and similarly lost his 20 acres of land in 1924 after the land revocation. Linwood, as a valued public speaker, was the first of many to address the members of the AAPA at their first meeting in 1925, which held more than 500 Indigenous Australians. The conference was held in Surry Hills, Sydney and caught the attention of the public, the news and authorities.

Joe Anderson 
Similarly, members of AAPA, Joe Anderson and his brothers lost their land in 1924 in the Burragorang valley. Forcing the family to relocate to Sydney and leave their homeland. This was Andersons motivation to become an activist for AAPA. Anderson wrote speeches and rallied with the AAPA to demand for equality around Sydney during the 1920s.

Elizabeth McKenzie-Hatton 
Elizabeth McKenzie-Hatton was a European who travelled around NSW to spread the message of the AAPA. She supported the cause by funding homes, under the control of the AAPA, for young Aboriginal girls who were escaping violence from their place of work. The homes were in direct opposition to government homes which resulted in the Protection Board demanding police harassment of the homes and constant surveillance. The home began in 1924 and ceased operations in 1925.

Within 6 months of its beginning, the AAPA had made a significant impact. McKenzie-Hatton had written more than 600 letters to the media and others of interest with travelling expensive exceeding 40 pounds. Travelling over 5,000 miles, McKenzie-Hatton helped gain support of Aboriginal people globally.

Protests and activities 

The AAPA was the first time Australia had witnessed Aboriginal political protest, increasing the significance of the organisation's actions. The organisation led protests and street rallies in an attempt to change Australia's political system to suit the rights of Indigenous Australians. They held conferences, wrote to newspapers and petitioned political leaders. The AAPA held three more conferences each year before their operations ceased, one conference lasting three days in Kempsey. Approximately 700 people were at the three-day conference where Aboriginal associations and individuals spoke.

At the Kempsey gathering, representatives from across the Northern Rivers region were in attendance. This purpose of this conference was to discuss the best approaches to furthering the AAPA. Eugene Miranda, President of Kempsey branch of the AAPA, introduced the conference, expressing his passion towards the association and political, spiritual and social connections he had to the group. John Donovan represented Nambucca Heads. On his return from the previous conference in Sydney, he congregated people together to form a new branch to expand the AAPA. Mr Flanders was representing Bowraville. This branch recognised its economic stability and decided it would help fund the AAPA through holding cricket matches for young men. Representative for Maclean, Mr Shannan, pushed for the values of the AAPA in his respective branch similar to other representatives and delegates.“As it is the proud boast of Australia that every person born beneath the Southern Cross is born free, irrespective of origin, race, colour, creed, religion or any other impediment. We the representatives of the original people, in conference assembled, demand that we shall be accorded the same full right and privileges of citizenship as are enjoyed by all other sections of the community”. - Fred MaynardThe organisation was inspired by the Universal Negro Improvement Association (UNIA) and their leader, Marcus Garvey, in how they approached gaining government attention. The AAPA held street marches and conventions similar to the UNIA as well as publicising articles in local newspapers to gain public attention. Maynard's presence in newspapers is what led to the Protections Board's decision to remove his rights to visit and speak on Aboriginal reserves.

The editor of Newcastle paper The Voice of North, J. J. Maloney, was an ally of Maynard. Maloney would publish Maynard's various pieces in his newspaper surrounding Aboriginal rights and striving for self-sufficiency and Indigenous governance, raising concerns about the oppression towards Aboriginal Australians and the ineffectiveness of the NSW APB.

The end of the AAPA 
The association was dissolved by the end of 1927. Aboriginal studies scholar John Maynard, Fred Maynard's grandson, believes that the main reason for the breakup of AAPA was harassment by police acting on behalf of the APB. The Inspector General of New South Wales Police was also APB chairman. AAPA members were threatened by police with gaol or removal of their children, and the APB ran smear campaigns in newspapers about AAPA members, especially Fred Maynard, and gave biased information about them to men in power, just as NSW Premier Jack Lang. The end of the AAPA is still debated as there is no solid reason for its disintegration. Many believe it to be the rise of the Great Depression, while Maynard's children attribute it to the scarcity of their father's work, and Uralla elder, Reuben Kelly, believed it to be because of Maynard's lack of persuasiveness.

Impact 
The association is not heard about much today; however, Australia's current Aboriginal political movements are greatly influenced by the foundation built by Maynard and the AAPA. The organisation gave a voice to Aboriginal people across Australia to fight against the oppression faced by Aboriginal people under Australia's colonial regime. The organisation left public memory shortly after their discontinuation due to continuous police scrutiny and government pressure, but has re-entered public discussion in recent times due to research by John Maynard into his grandfather, Fred Maynard, and the workings of the AAPA.

References

Further reading

 Report of a biennial meeting

 Letter to the Daily Examiner newspaper from Organising Secretary of the AAPA, E. McKenzie Hatton, thanking readers for their support
 (200?)

1924 establishments in Australia
1927 disestablishments in Australia
Organisations serving Indigenous Australians
Indigenous Australian politics
History of Indigenous Australians
Indigenous rights organizations